Mohamed Ali El Admi (born Mohamed Ali Ould el Wali and commonly known by his nom de guerre Omar Hadrami) is a Sahrawi politician and ex-senior member of the Polisario Front, which he co-founded.

El Admi joined Morocco in 1989 and settled in Rabat. He has been accused of many human rights violations including alleged war crimes, torture of Moroccan prisoners of war and Sahrawi dissidents in the refugee camps.

In January 2014, Mohammed VI appointed him as the Wali (governor) of the Guelmim-Es Semara region.

Positions in Morocco
 Governor of Kelaat Sraghna 25 January 1995 – 27 September 1998
 Governor of Sidi Kacem 27 September 1998 – 11 January 2002
 Wali of Chaouia-Ouardigha 11 January 2002 – 20 January 2007

See also
 Former members of the Polisario Front

References

Living people
1949 births
Moroccan politicians
Moroccan civil servants
Polisario Front politicians
Sahrawi politicians
People from Smara